"Party All Night (Sleep All Day)" is a song by American-Jamaican recording artist Sean Kingston. The song was originally released as the fourth single from Kingston's third studio album, Back 2 Life, but was taken off for unknown reasons. It was released digitally on December 21, 2010 in the United States. It has peaked at number two on the Bubbling Under Hot 100 Singles chart. It was written by August Rigo, Duane Harden, Stargate, Sandy Vee and Polina Goudieva, and it was produced by Stargate and Sandy Vee. The tune of the song is taken from the 1983 song "I Can't Dance" by David Hentschel which appeared in the 1983 film Educating Rita.

The song was featured in the summer blockbusters The Inbetweeners Movie and Shark Night 3D, which caused the song to chart highly on the UK and Irish Singles Charts.

Music video
A music video to accompany the release of the song was uploaded to YouTube on December 15, 2010 at a total length of three minutes and fifty-two seconds.

Track listing

Charts

Weekly charts

Year-end charts

Certifications

Release history

References

2010 singles
Sean Kingston songs
Songs written by August Rigo
Song recordings produced by Stargate (record producers)
Songs written by Tor Erik Hermansen
Songs written by Mikkel Storleer Eriksen
Songs written by Sandy Vee
Epic Records singles
Song recordings produced by Sandy Vee
Songs written by Duane Harden
Songs about parties
2010 songs